Francis Earl Curran (December 19, 1912 – October 18, 1992) was an American Democratic politician from California.



Biography
Frank Curran was born in 1912 in Cleveland, Ohio. His father was a boxer under the name "Red Kenney" and operated a wallpaper-hanging business. The family moved to Oceanside, California in 1919. Curran met his wife Florance on Oceanside Pier and they were married in 1936. She was born 1913 in Denver.

Curran was elected to the San Diego City Council and served from 1955–1963. He was elected Mayor of San Diego in 1962, and served between 1963 and 1971.  During his term, the Civic Center was built, a ballot issue passed to build a new stadium in Mission Valley, and a metropolitan sewer system.  He said "If we hadn't built that, we couldn't have done anything else."  At the end of his term Curran was embroiled in the "Yellow Cab" bribery scandal. It was alleged he raised taxi rates for campaign contributions. He and seven city council members were indicted. Curran was cleared by a jury, but could not escape the charge politically. He did not resign, but his hopes of running again for any office were lost.  After Curran left as mayor he continued to be active in civic affairs. He was director for the Central City Association.

Curran died in 1992 after suffering from a broken vertebra and is buried at Eternal Hills Memorial Park. His wife Florance died January 4, 2000. Curran's brother Richard was a Municipal Court judge.

San Diego City College
Curran took classes at San Diego Junior College, now San Diego City College. While mayor he had a walkway built over a busy street so students could easily cross to get to classes.  After Curran's widow died, it was found out he left his entire estate, worth about US$1,000,000, to City College. Curran Plaza was named to honor his efforts for City College.

References

 "An Interview with the Honorable Frank Curran" (Robert Wright, ed. and interviewer, March 26, 1983). San Diego Historical Society Oral History Program
 "Frank Curran: Mayor of the City in Motion." (University of San Diego thesis, 1993) by Laurence N. Kalder
 "Richard J. Curran Retired Judge" (obituary), The San Diego Union-Tribune January 23, 2005
 "Florence Curran widow of ex-mayor" (obituary), The San Diego Union-Tribune January 10, 2000

1912 births
1992 deaths
Mayors of San Diego
People from Oceanside, California
20th-century American politicians